Atalanta B.C. lost its momentum it had built in its first two Serie A seasons in its stint, eventually being relegated following a playoff against Reggina. The championship was such competitive than Atalanta was only four points away from repeating its 9th place from the 2001-02 season, but instead had to face Serie B competition, losing key players such as Cristiano Doni, Luciano Zauri and Ousmane Dabo to bigger clubs.

Squad

Goalkeepers
  Massimo Taibi
  Alex Calderoni

Defenders
  Gianpaolo Bellini
  Massimo Carrera
  Fabiano
  Paolo Foglio
  Natale Gonnella
  Cesare Natali
  Fabio Rustico
  Luigi Sala
  Sebastiano Siviglia
  Paolo Tramezzani
  Damiano Zenoni
  Danilo Zini

Midfielders
  Daniele Berretta
  Yuri Breviario
  Ousmane Dabo
  Cristiano Doni
  Vinicio Espinal
  Ivan Javorčić
  Carmine Gautieri
  Alex Pinardi
  Luciano Zauri
  Apostolos Liolidis

Attackers
  Rolando Bianchi
  Gianni Comandini
  Piá
  Julien Rantier
  Fausto Rossini
  Luca Saudati
  Davor Vugrinec

Serie A

League table

Matches

 Juventus-Atalanta 3-0
 1-0 Alessandro Del Piero (27 pen)
 2-0 Alessandro Del Piero (34)
 3-0 Salvatore Fresi (90 + 1)
 Atalanta-Bologna 2-2
 0-1 Salvatore Fresi (13)
 1-1 Cristiano Doni (18)
 2-1 Cristiano Doni (51 pen)
 2-2 Claudio Bellucci (77 pen)
 Udinese-Atalanta 1-0
 1-0 Néstor Sensini (60)
 Atalanta-Lazio 0-1
 0-1 César (24)
 Atalanta-Milan 1-4
 0-1 Rivaldo (15)
 1-1 Luigi Sala (30)
 1-2 Jon Dahl Tomasson (41)
 1-3 Andrea Pirlo (66 pen)
 1-4 Andrea Pirlo (81)
 Parma-Atalanta 2-1
 1-0 Hidetoshi Nakata (14)
 2-0 Adrian Mutu (71)
 2-1 Gianni Comandini (85)
 Atalanta-Piacenza 2-0
 1-0 Luigi Sala (78)
 2-0 Gianni Comandini (88)
 Atalanta-Modena 1-3
 0-1 Giuseppe Colucci (13)
 0-2 Diomansy Kamara (39)
 0-3 Stefano Mauri (75)
 1-3 Ousmane Dabo (89)
 Chievo-Atalanta 4-1
 0-1 Luigi Sala (40)
 1-1 Federico Cossato (45)
 2-1 Daniele Franceschini (56)
 3-1 Simone Perrotta (84)
 4-1 Federico Cossato (87)
 Atalanta-Brescia 2-0
 1-0 Ousmane Dabo (69)
 2-0 Gianni Comandini (73)
 Reggina-Atalanta 1-1
 0-1 Carmine Gautieri (34)
 1-1 Gianluca Savoldi (56)
 Atalanta-Perugia 0-2
 0-1 Fabrizio Miccoli (21)
 0-2 Massimiliano Fusani (79)
 Inter-Atalanta 1-0
 1-0 Mohamed Kallon (70)
 Atalanta-Empoli 2-2
 1-0 Cristiano Doni (13)
 2-0 Damiano Zenoni (33)
 2-1 Gaetano Grieco (85)
 2-2 Francesco Tavano (89)
 Torino-Atalanta 1-1
 0-1 Cesare Natali (14)
 1-1 Luca Mezzano (61)
 Como-Atalanta 1-1
 1-0 Saša Bjelanović (45 + 1)
 1-1 Paolo Foglio (53)
 Atalanta-Roma 2-1
 0-1 Francesco Totti (9)
 1-1 Cristiano Doni (40)
 2-1 Paolo Tramezzani (85)
 Modena-Atalanta 0-2
 0-1 Ousmane Dabo (35)
 0-2 Alex Pinardi (85)
 Atalanta-Juventus 1-1
 1-0 Alex Pinardi (40)
 1-1 Marco Di Vaio (50)
 Bologna-Atalanta 2-3
 0-1 Alex Pinardi (28)
 0-2 Alex Pinardi (49)
 1-2 Giuseppe Signori (69 pen)
 2-2 Giuseppe Signori (72 pen)
 2-3 Fausto Rossini (90 + 4)
 Atalanta-Udinese 0-0
 Lazio-Atalanta 0-0
 Milan-Atalanta 3-3
 0-1 Paolo Maldini (1 og)
 0-2 Fausto Rossini (29)
 0-3 Fausto Rossini (30)
 1-3 Filippo Inzaghi (34)
 2-3 Jon Dahl Tomasson (70)
 3-3 Filippo Inzaghi (79)
 Atalanta-Parma 0-0
 Piacenza-Atalanta 2-0
 1-0 Dario Hübner (41)
 2-0 Ciro De Cesare (89)
 Atalanta-Chievo 1-0
 1-0 Ousmane Dabo (52)
 Brescia-Atalanta 3-0
 1-0 Stephen Appiah (31)
 2-0 Roberto Baggio (52)
 3-0 Fabio Petruzzi (85)
 Atalanta-Reggina 1-1
 1-0 Cristiano Doni (9)
 1-1 Emiliano Bonazzoli (52)
 Perugia-Atalanta 1-0
 1-0 Luigi Pagliuca (78)
 Atalanta-Torino 2-2
 0-1 Massimo Donati (22)
 1-1 Cristiano Doni (75)
 1-2 Massimo Donati (89)
 2-2 Cristiano Doni (90 + 2 pen)
 Atalanta-Inter 1-1
 0-1 Obafemi Martins (13)
 1-1 Carmine Gautieri (71)
 Empoli-Atalanta 0-0
 Atalanta-Como 2-1
 0-1 Nicola Caccia (17)
 1-1 Cristiano Doni (63 pen)
 2-1 Cristiano Doni (81)
 Roma-Atalanta 1-2
 0-1 Cristiano Doni (27)
 1-1 Daniele De Rossi (30)
 1-2 Carmine Gautieri (55)

Relegation playoffs

 Reggina-Atalanta 0-0
 Atalanta-Reggina 1-2
 1-0 Cesare Natali (18)
 1-1 Francesco Cozza (35)
 1-2 Emiliano Bonazzoli (85)

Atalanta relegated, with Reggina staying in Serie A 2003-04.

Scores Overview

Topscorers
  Cristiano Doni 10
  Alex Pinardi 4
  Fausto Rossini 3
  Gianni Comandini 3
  Luigi Sala 3

References

Sources
  RSSSF - Italy 2002/03

Atalanta B.C. seasons
Atalanta